The Harold Adams Office Building is a historic commercial building at 2101 South H Street in Fort Smith, Arkansas.  It is a single-story Mid-century modern office building, designed by the regionally prominent architect Harold Eugene Adams, one of the first architects to graduate from the architecture department of the University of Arkansas at Fayetteville, for use as his professional office. The office is a high-quality small-scale example of his work, which it was designed to showcase.

The building was listed on the National Register of Historic Places in 2014.

See also
National Register of Historic Places listings in Sebastian County, Arkansas

References

Office buildings on the National Register of Historic Places in Arkansas
Buildings and structures in Fort Smith, Arkansas
National Register of Historic Places in Sebastian County, Arkansas
Office buildings completed in 1960